Chari Wanda Hawkins (born May 21, 1991) is an American track and field athlete who competes in combined events. She became the 2022 US National Pentathlon Champion with a gold medal performance at the  USATF Indoor Championships in Spokane, Washington. She represented the US in the heptathlon at the 2019 World Championships in Doha finishing 12th overall. 

In 2022 she earned recognition by USATF for Athlete of the Week for her first-place finish in the heptathlon at the World Athletics Combined Events Tour -Gold event held in Arona, Spain where she achieved a personal best with 6,243 points.

Other career heptathlon highlights include capturing bronze at the 2019 USATF Outdoor Championships, winning silver at the 2018 Pan American Combined Events, earning bronze at the 2017 Thorpe Cup and finishing fourth at the 2015 World University Games. 

In the pentathlon event she won a bronze medal at the 2016 USATF Indoor Championships and finished fifth at the 2017 USATF Indoor Championships.

International competitions

Personal bests
Outdoor
200 metres – 24.42 (-1.1 m/s, Des Moines 2019)
800 metres – 2:15.01 (Santa Barbara 2016)
100 metres hurdles – 13.17 (-0.1 m/s, Long Beach 2019)
High jump – 1.85 (Arona 2022)
Long jump – 6.29 (+0.7 m/s, Long Beach 2019)
Shot put – 14.26 (Chula Vista 2021)
Javelin throw – 44.15 (Götzis 2019)
Heptathlon – 6243 (Arona 2022)
Indoor
800 metres – 2:22.08 (Crete, NE, 2016)
60 metres hurdles – 8.20 (Spokane 2022)
High jump – 1.84 (Spokane 2022)
Long jump – 6.02 (Albuquerque 2015)
Shot put – 13.53 (Spokane 2022)
Pentathlon – 4491 (Spokane 2022)

References

External links 
 

1991 births
Living people
American heptathletes
World Athletics Championships athletes for the United States
Competitors at the 2015 Summer Universiade
21st-century American women
20th-century American women